René Pollesch (born 29 October 1962 in Friedberg, Hesse) is a German author and dramatist.
From 1983 to 89, he studied Applied Theatre Studies at the University of Giessen. He won the Mülheimer Dramatikerpreis in 2001 for world wide web-slums and again in 2006
for Cappuccetto Rosso.
He has been named as the new director of Berlin's Volksbühne Theatre in 2019 and take up the role in 2021

References

External links 
 

1962 births
Living people
German male dramatists and playwrights
21st-century German dramatists and playwrights
Members of the Academy of Arts, Berlin
People from Friedberg, Hesse